Ali Amini was appointed to rule by decree as the Prime Minister of Iran on 5 May 1961, succeeding Jafar Sharif-Emami. His cabinet was approved on 9 May 1961.

Shah Mohammad Reza Pahlavi was not enthusiastic about appointing Ali Amini as prime minister. In addition, the Kennedy administration established a task force, the Iran Task Force, to support the cabinet of Amini which was regarded by the Shah as a move to reduce his power and authority.

Composition
Though Amini was considered a "maverick aristocrat" and "too independent of the personal control of the monarch", appointment of ministers of foreign affairs, war, the interior was made at the behest of the Shah. All of the three portfolios, plus agriculture ministry were left unchanged in the next administration under Asadollah Alam.

Most controversially, Amini gave three ministries to "middle-class reformers who had in the past criticized the political influence of the shah as well as the corrupt practices of the landed families". The three portfolios were justice, agriculture and education ministries. Noureddin Alamouti, an ex-member of the Tudeh Party who later entered the inner circle of Ahmad Qavam was appointed as the justice minister while agriculture ministry went to Hassan Arsanjani who was a radical and another protege of Qavam. Muhammad Derekhshesh who was as a leader of teacher's trade union drew support from both the Tudeh and the National Front, became the education minister. Moreover, he included Gholam-Ali Farivar as the industry minister in his cabinet, who was a former leader of the Iran Party (a party affiliated with the National Front).

Cabinet
Members of Amini's cabinet were as follows:

References

External links

1961 establishments in Iran
1962 disestablishments in Iran
Cabinets established in 1961
Cabinets disestablished in 1962
Cabinets of Iran